Herbert Fleischmann (1925–1984) was a German film and television actor. He was married several times including to the actress Ruth Leuwerik.

Partial filmography

 Barbara (1961) as Gabriel
  (1963) as Dr. Konetzki
 Der Kardinal von Spanien (1965) as Herzog von Estival
  (1967) as Robert Hendrich
 The Girl from Rio (1969) as Carl
 Hate Is My God (1969) as Alex Carter
 Maximilian von Mexiko (1970, TV Series) as Sir Charles Wyke
 Hauser's Memory (1970, TV Movie) as Werner Renner
 The Bordello (1971) as Leopold Grün
 Und Jimmy ging zum Regenbogen (1971) as Jean Mercier
  (1971) as Nico
 Love Is Only a Word (1971) as Manfred Angenfort
 Der Kommissar (1971-1975, TV Series) as Dr. Schneider / Alwin Schenk / Willi Kaiser
 The Stuff That Dreams Are Made Of (1972) as Bertie Engelhardt
 Sonderdezernat K1 (1972, TV Series) as Dr. Robert Steenkamp
 All People Will Be Brothers (1973) as Police Inspector Eilers
  (1973) as Frantzen
  (1973) as Otto Westermann
 Three Men in the Snow (1974) as Zenkel
 Only the Wind Knows the Answer (1974) as Gustav Brandenburg
 Derrick (1974-1984, TV Series) as Dr. Wolfgang Rohm / Professor Joachim von Haidersfeld Alfred Answald / Mahler / Ernst Windorf / Herr Ludemann / Broll (final appearance)
 Crime After School (1975) as Alexander Gregor
  (1976, TV Mini-Series) as Rolf Klein
 Es muss nicht immer Kaviar sein (1977, TV Series) as Major Loos
  (1977, TV Mini-Series) as Chief Inspector Hal Yardley
 Tatort (1978, TV Series) as Peter Huck, ihr Mann
 Die Protokolle des Herrn M. (1979, TV Series) as Walter Mannhardt
 Der Fuchs von Övelgönne (1981, TV Series) as Herbert Niessen
 The Old Fox: Tote Lumpen jagt man nicht (1982, TV Series) as Bodo Lammers

References

Bibliography 
 Goble, Alan. The Complete Index to Literary Sources in Film. Walter de Gruyter, 1999.

External links 
 

1925 births
1984 deaths
Actors from Nuremberg
German male television actors
German male film actors
German male stage actors